is a town located in Kōka District, Shiga Prefecture, Japan.

As of 2004, the town has an estimated population of 13,885 and a density of 84.92 persons per km².  The total area is 163.5 km².

On October 1, 2004, Shigaraki, along with the towns of Kōka, Kōnan, Minakuchi and Tsuchiyama (all from Kōka District), was merged to create the city of Kōka.

It also served as the imperial capital for several months in 745, before moving to Heijō-kyō due to a forest fire destroying the palace (Shigaraki Palace).

Shigaraki is famous for its ceramic kilns since ancient times. The area is known for its clay beds, and locally mined clay is often used by local potters. Works produced here are known as Shigaraki-yaki. Many local potters use wood fired anagama kilns. Many tanuki statues are also produced here.

Climate

References

External links
 Japanese National Tourism Organization JNTO
Shigaraki Access Map

Dissolved municipalities of Shiga Prefecture
Kōka, Shiga